Upper Squabble is a ghost town located in Perry County, Kentucky, United States.

References

Geography of Perry County, Kentucky
Ghost towns in Kentucky